Dalelia or Dalilea (from  ) is hamlet on the north shore of Loch Shiel in Acharacle district of Argyll, Scottish Highlands and is in the Scottish council area of Highland. Kinlochmoidart is to the north. The alternate Gaelic name "Dàil an Leigh" has been suggested but this is believed to be a folk etymology for Dàil Eileadh.

History
Dalelia is most famous as the birthplace of Alasdair mac Mhaighstir Alasdair, who along with Sorley MacLean remains one of the two most important figures in the history of Scottish Gaelic literature. The Clanranald Bard, as he has since been dubbed by Hamish Henderson, is also notable for having been chosen, due to his "skill in the Highland Language", to teach  Scottish Gaelic to Prince Charles Edward Stuart during the Jacobite rising of 1745.

When the Bard was born at Dalilea in about 1700, his father, Maighstir Alasdair MacDhòmhnaill (Rev. Dr. Alexander MacDonald, 1st of Dalilea), was the Non-Juring Episcopalian Rector of Kilchoan and held the tack of Dalelia. 

After his death c.1724, Maighstir Alasdair MacDhòmhnaill was succeeded as tacksman by his eldest son, Aonghas Beag MacDhòmhnaill (Angus MacDonald, 2nd of Dalelia), who married Margaret Cameron, a devoutly Roman Catholic woman from Achadhuan, in Lochaber. According to Father Charles MacDonald, the places where Margaret MacDonald had said her prayers had survived in the local oral tradition and were pointed out to him by a Seanchaidh during the 1880s. Under Margaret's influence, Aonghas Beag MacDhòmhnaill converted from the Scottish Episcopal Church to Roman Catholicism and served as Captain over the men of Dalelia during the Jacobite Rising of 1745. Like his younger brother, Aonghas Beag survived the no quarter given to the Jacobite Army after the final defeat of the uprising at the Battle of Culloden in 1746. 

During the year that followed the Battle, which is still referred to in the Highlands and Islands as Bliadhna nan Creach ("The Year of the Pillaging"), the Bard's birthplace at Dalilea was plundered by Hanoverian redcoats.

Despite this, Aonghas Beag returned to his native district, where he had to remain in hiding for two years and only rarely dared to visit his family. After the act of indemnity was passed, Aonghas Beag MacDhòmhnaill returned to Dalelia, where he finished his days in peace.

After more than 800 years of ownership by the line of Somerled, Dalilea House and the surrounding district, along with the estates of Lochans, Eilean Shona, and the Isle of Muck, were sold in 1813, both to cover the debts and to fund the extremely extravagant spending of Ranald George Macdonald, 19th Chief of Clanranald.

Today, Dalilea is a working farm with self-catered accommodation for tourists and boats for hire.

References

Populated places in Lochaber